Daithi Doolan (born 13 May 1968, Cork) is an Irish politician. A member of  Sinn Féin, he is a councillor on Dublin City Council.

Election results

Local elections
As Sinn Féin candidate in the 1999 local elections for the Dublin South East Inner City, Doolan polled 13.38%, coming fourth and missing out on a seat by 62 votes.

In 2004 Doolan recontested in the area polling 24.11%, securing the second position. In the 2009 election he polled 11.9% and lost his seat by 259 votes.

At the 2014 elections, Doolan contested in the Dublin Ballyfermot Drimnagh area, and topped the poll with 19.28%.

General elections
Doolan contested the 2002 general election, attaining 2,398 first preference votes (7.39%) in Dublin South-East, coming seventh thereby missing out on one of the top four positions. In the 2007 general election he polled 1,599 first preference votes (4.72%) in the same area, again coming seventh.

Career
As an elected councillor between 2004 and 2009, Doolan called for the easing of restrictions on immigrant workers, and for better fire-safety provisions in apartment construction. He opposed the creation of an energy-from-waste facility at Poolbeg, supported the Shell to Sea campaign and opposed cuts to Dublin public services.

After losing his seat in June 2009, Doolan was hired in October as the coordinator for the 'Dublin Citywide Drugs Crisis Campaign', an organisation that promotes a community development approach to tackling the drugs problem. As coordinator Doolan criticised the Government of Ireland for scrapping the once full-time position of 'Minister for National Drugs Strategy' and regulating that role to another Minister with other responsibilities. As well as calling for a full-time junior minister, Doolan and CityWide requested the government scrap proposed funding cuts for drug services, also asking for additional funding for the issue, as well as for community participation and consultation for handling the drugs problem.

In September 2011 Doolan left Citywide to take up a post as parliamentary assistant to Peadar Tóibín TD, Sinn Féin spokesperson on enterprise, jobs, innovation and the Gaeltacht. Before being re-elected to Dublin City Council in 2014, Doolan was parliamentary assistant to Brian Stanley TD.

Joseph Rafferty controversy
Doolan was involved in controversy after a Dubliner, Joseph Rafferty, was shot dead. Rafferty's sister, Esther Uzell-Rafferty, claimed that the IRA had killed her brother, and that Doolan knew the identity of his killer, claims which Doolan denied. Doolan's denial of involvement in the murder was later backed up by a report from Taoiseach Bertie Ahern. Ahern stated "I don't think there were any instructions given by the IRA," adding: "Elements, probably of criminality, claimed they had links with republicans." Doolan has called for public co-operation with the Garda in the investigation of Rafferty's murder.

Personal life
Doolan is married with four children. He has been a strict vegetarian since he was 16 because of his concerns for the environment.

References

External links
CityWide Drug Crisis Campaign Official Site
Daithí Doolan's Twitter Account

1968 births
Living people
Sinn Féin politicians
Politicians from County Cork
Local councillors in Dublin (city)